"Gotta Find My Baby" is a rock and roll song written and recorded in 1941 by Peter Joe Clayton under the name "Doctor Clayton."  In the 1950s, cover versions of the were recorded as "I Got To Find My Baby" by other Rhythm & Blues artists, including B.B. King (1952), Little Walter (1954) and Chuck Berry, who is sometimes miscredited as the song's composer. The song was also covered by The Beatles in 1963.

Original version

Blues singer Peter Clayton composed "Gotta Find My Baby" in 1941 and recorded it in Chicago on November 11th for Bluebird Records under the name "Doctor Clayton."  The song was released on January 9, 1942 as Bluebird B8901 and later included on Doctor Clayton - His Complete Recorded Works (Document CD DOCD 5179).

Chuck Berry version
Chuck Berry recorded the song at Chess Records on February 12, 1960, and it was released in August 1960 as a single under the title "I Got To Find My Baby" with "Mad Lad" as its B-side (Chess 1763), but the single did not chart.

The Beatles version

The Beatles first recorded their version of Chuck Berry's rendition of the song on June 1, 1963 at the BBC Paris Studioin London for the second Pop Go The Beatles radio show. The group recorded two versions of the song as "I Got to Find My Baby" (credited to Berry). The song was first broadcast on June 11 and was later included on the 1994 album Live at the BBC. Later that month, they performed the song on the Saturday Club program on June 24. The performance was taped at the Playhouse Theatre in London, and was first broadcast five days later.

The Beatles had already performed several songs written by Chuck Berry. John Lennon sang lead vocal and played harmonica, as he did on most of their covers of Berry's songs.

Personnel
John Lennon – vocals, harmonica, rhythm guitar
Paul McCartney – bass
George Harrison – lead guitar
Ringo Starr – drums

Other versions
"Gotta Find My Baby" was also recorded in 1954 by bluesman and harmonica player Little Walter for Chess Records, the same record label as Chuck Berry.

Notes

Songs written by Chuck Berry
The Beatles songs
1963 songs
Song recordings produced by George Martin
Bluebird Records singles